The Mexico City Metrobús Line 2 is a bus rapid transit line in the Mexico City Metrobus. It operates between Tepalcates, in Iztapalapa and Tacubaya in the Miguel Hidalgo municipality, in western Mexico City.

Line 2 has a total of 36 stations and a length of 20 kilometers and it runs from east to west through Eje 4 Sur.

Construction of Line 2 started on September 4, 2007 and it was inaugurated on December 16, 2008 by Marcelo Ebrard, Head of Government of the Federal District from 2006 to 2012.

Service description

Services
The line has six itineraries.

Tepalcates to Tacubaya
To Tacubaya
First Bus: 4:30 (Monday-Friday)
Last Bus: 23:57 (Monday-Friday)
First Bus: 4:30 (Saturday)
Last Bus: 00:00 (Saturday)
First Bus: 5:00 (Sunday)
Last Bus: 23:50 (Sunday)

To Tepalcates
First Bus: 4:35 (Monday-Friday)
Last Bus: 23:59 (Monday-Friday)
First Bus: 4:35 (Saturday)
Last Bus: 00:00 (Saturday)
First Bus: 5:00 (Sunday)
Last Bus: 00:02 (Sunday)

Tepalcates to Etiopía
To Etiopía
First Bus: 5:00 (Monday-Friday)
Last Bus: 21:59 (Monday-Friday)
First Bus: 5:30 (Saturday)
Last Bus: 21:11 (Saturday)
No service on Sunday

To Tepalcates
First Bus: 5:25 (Monday-Friday)
Last Bus: 22:25 (Monday-Friday)
First Bus: 7:12 (Saturday)
Last Bus: 20:00 (Saturday)
No service on Sunday

Tepalcates to Colonia del Valle (Line 1)
To Colonia del Valle
First Bus: 4:36 (Monday-Friday)
Last Bus: 23:00 (Monday-Friday)
First Bus: 4:37 (Saturday)
Last Bus: 23:01 (Saturday)
First Bus: 5:06 (Sunday)
Last Bus: 23:01 (Sunday)

To Tepalcates
First Bus: 4:45 (Monday-Friday)
Last Bus: 23:00 (Monday-Friday)
First Bus: 4:45 (Saturday)
Last Bus: 23:22 (Saturday)
First Bus: 5:15 (Sunday)
Last Bus: 23:02 (Sunday)

Tepalcates to Nápoles (Line 1)
To Nápoles
First Bus: 4:47 (daily)
Last Bus: 21:13 (daily)

To Tepalcates
First Bus: 5:31 (daily)
Last Bus: 23:19 (daily)

Rojo Gómez to Doctor Gálvez (Line 1)
To Doctor Gálvez
First Bus: 5:30 (Monday–Friday)
Last Bus: 20:56 (Monday–Friday)
No service on Saturday and Sunday

To Rojo Gómez
First Bus: 5:41 (Monday–Friday)
Last Bus: 21:27 (Monday–Friday)
No service on Saturday and Sunday

Río Frío to Colonia del Valle (Line 1)
To Colonia del Valle
First Bus: 5:30 (Monday–Friday)
Last Bus: 10:28 (Monday–Friday)
No service on Saturday and Sunday

To Río Frío
First Bus: 6:26 (Monday–Friday)
Last Bus: 11:25 (Monday–Friday)
No service on Saturday and Sunday

Line 2 services the Iztapalapa, Iztacalco, Benito Juárez, Cuauhtémoc, and Miguel Hidalgo and Álvaro Obregón boroughs.

Station list

Tepalcates–Tacubaya
{| class="wikitable"
|-
! width="160px" | Stations
! Connections
! Neighborhood(s) 
! width="100px" | Borough
! Picture
! Date opened
|-
|  Tepalcates
|
 Tepalcates
  Line A: Tepalcates station
 Routes: 162-B, 163, 163-A, 163-B, 164, 166, 167
 Routes: 9-D, 9-E
| Unidad Habitacional Ejército Constitucionalista, Tepalcates
| rowspan=13| Iztapalapa
| 
| rowspan=18| December 16, 2008
|-
|  Nicolás Bravo
| 
 Routes: 162-B, 163, 163-A, 163-B, 164, 166, 167
| rowspan=4| Tepalcates
|-
|  Canal de San Juan
|
  Line A: Canal de San Juan station (at distance)
 Routes: 47-A, 162-B, 163, 163-A, 163-B, 164, 166, 167
 Routes: 4-B, 4-C, 9-B, 9-E, 14-A
|-
|  General Antonio de León
|
|-
|  Constitución de Apatzingán
|
 Routes: 4-C, 9-A
|-
|  CCH Oriente
|
 Route: 4-C
| Unidad Habitacional Ejército Constitucionalista
|-
|  Leyes de Reforma
|
| Colonia Leyes de Reforma 3@ Sección
|-
|  Del Moral
|
| Colonia Cuchilla del Moral, Colonia Leyes de Reforma 3@ Sección
|-
|  Río Frío
|
| Colonia Cuchilla del Moral
|-
|  Rojo Gómez
|
| rowspan=2| Colonia Dr. Alfonso Díaz Tirado
|-
|  Río Mayo
|
|-
|  Río Tecolutla
|
| Colonia Real del Moral
|-
|  El Rodeo
|
 Route: 14-A
| Colonia Paseos de Churubusco, Colonia El Rodeo
| 
|-
|  UPIICSA
|
| rowspan=2| Colonia Granjas México, Colonia Ampliación Gabriel Ramos Millán
| rowspan=9| Iztacalco
| 
|-
|  Iztacalco
|
 Route: 14-A
| 
|-
|  Goma
|
 Routes: 43, 200
 Route: 14-A
| rowspan=3| Colonia Granjas México, Colonia Gabriel Ramos Millán
| 
|-
|  Tlacotal
|
| 
|-
|  Canela
| 
| 
|-
|  Metro Coyuya
| 
  Line 5: Metro Coyuya station (also temporary Line 12 service)
 Coyuya
  Line 8: Coyuya station
 Route: 14-A
| Coyuya, Granjas México, Barrio de los Reyes, Tlazintla
|
| September 7, 2020
|-
|  Coyuya
| 
| Santa Anita, Barrio Los Reyes
| 
| rowspan=18| December 16, 2008
|-
|  La Viga
|
 Route: 37
| Nueva Santa Anita, Barrio San Francisco Xicaltongo
| 
|-
|  Andrés Molina
| 
| Nueva Santa Anita, Barrio San Pedro
| 
|-
|  Las Américas
|
| Colonia Moderna
| rowspan=7| Benito Juárez
| 
|-
|  Xola
|
  Line 2: Xola station
 Routes: 2-A, 31-B, 111-A, 145-A
 Routes: 17-C, 17-H, 17-I
| rowspan=2| Colonia Álamos
| 
|-
|  Álamos
| 
| 
|-
|  Centro SCOP
| 
 Line 1: Centro SCOP stop
| rowspan=2| Narvarte Oriente
| 
|-
|  Doctor Vértiz
| 
| 
|-
|  Etiopía / Plaza de la Transparencia
|
  Line 3: Etiopía / Plaza de la Transparencia station 

  Line 3: Etiopía / Plaza de la Transparencia station
| Narvarte Poniente
| 
|-
|  Amores
|
| Colonia del Valle Norte
| 
|-
|  Viaducto
|
  Line 1: Nuevo León station (at distance)
| Colonia Roma Sur
| rowspan=2| Cuauhtémoc
| 
|-
|  Nuevo León
|
  Line 1: Nuevo León station

| Hipódromo
| 
|-
|  Escandón
| 
| rowspan=2| Hipódromo, Escandón
| rowspan=3| Cuauhtémoc, Miguel Hidalgo
| 
|-
|  Patriotismo
|

  Line 9: Patriotismo station
 Routes: 13-A, 115-A, 200
 Routes: 9-C, 9-E, 21-A
| 
|-
|  De La Salle
| 
 Routes: 13-A, 115-A, 200
| Hipódromo Condesa, Escandón
| 
|-
|  Parque Lira
| 
| San Miguel Chapultepec
| rowspan=3| Miguel Hidalgo
| 
|-
|  Antonio Maceo
|
| rowspan=2| Tacubaya
|-
|  Tacubaya
| 
 Tacubaya
<li> (at distance)
<li>  Line 1: Tacubaya station
<li>  Line 7: Tacubaya station
<li>  Line 9: Tacubaya station
<li> Routes: 110, 110-B, 110-C, 112, 113-B, 115, 118, 119, 200
<li> Routes: 1-B, 9-C, 9-E, 21-A
| 
|}

Tepalcates–Doctor Gálvez branch
The route runs from Tepalcates to Viaducto normally. As soon as it reaches Avenida de los Insurgentes, the route detours towards Southern Mexico City sharing the same stations Line 1 uses. The branch originally ran from Tepalcates to Colonia del Valle stations, but since 31 October 2022, there is an additional service that runs from Rojo Gómez station to Doctor Gálvez station.

Operators
Line 2 has five operators.

Corredor Oriente - Poniente, SA de CV (COP)
Corredor Eje 4 - 17 de Marzo, SA de CV (CE4-17MSA)
Transportes Sánchez Armas José Juan, SA de CV (TSA)
Corredor Tacubaya - Tepalcates, SA de CV (CTT)
Red de Transporte de Pasajeros del Distrito Federal

Notes

References

2008 establishments in Mexico
2
Bus rapid transit in Mexico